The Courtyard St. Louis Downtown/Convention Center is a historic hotel in downtown St. Louis, Missouri. The 25-story hotel opened on September 2, 1929 as the Lennox Hotel and was the tallest hotel in the city upon its opening. Designed by Preston J. Bradshaw in the Renaissance Revival style, the building features terra cotta faces and cornices. The hotel, along with the Hotel Statler and the Mayfair Hotel, was built as part of a commercial boom in downtown St. Louis in the 1920s. It was the last hotel built in the area before the Great Depression, and another hotel did not open in downtown St. Louis until 1963. The Lennox Hotel eventually closed after newer hotels were built in the 1970s. The hotel was added to the National Register of Historic Places on September 6, 1984.

It was renovated in 2002 and reopened as the Renaissance St. Louis Suites Hotel. The hotel was foreclosed in 2009 by its bondholders after it failed to generate enough revenue to cover interest payments. It closed in November 2011. It was sold in December 2013 to Maritz, Wolff & Co., which spent $15 million on a complete renovation. It reopened on September 2, 2015 as the Courtyard St. Louis Downtown/Convention Center.

References

External links

Hotel buildings on the National Register of Historic Places in Missouri
Renaissance Revival architecture in Missouri
Hotel buildings completed in 1929
National Register of Historic Places in St. Louis
Hotels in St. Louis
Downtown St. Louis
Buildings and structures in St. Louis
1929 establishments in Missouri